Wyatt Prunty (born May 15, 1947, in Humboldt, Tennessee) is the author of nine collections of poetry. His critical work, “Fallen from the Symboled World”: Precedents for the New Formalism, is available from Oxford University Press. Editor of Sewanee Writers on Writing (LSU Press, 2000), he has also served as general editor of the Sewanee Writers’ Series and currently serves as editor of The Johns Hopkins Poetry and Fiction Series. He has taught at The Johns Hopkins Writing Seminars, Louisiana State University, Washington and Lee University, and Sewanee, where he is the Ogden P. Carlton Professor of Literature. He is a recipient of Guggenheim, Rockefeller, Johns Hopkins, and Brown Foundation fellowships. He has served as Chancellor of the Fellowship of Southern Writers. He is the Founding Director of the Sewanee Writers’ Conference and the Tennessee Williams Fellowship program, and he is the Editor of the Johns Hopkins Poetry and Fiction Series.

Awards
 1986 Brown Foundation Fellowship
 2001 Guggenheim Fellowship
 2001 Rockefeller Foundation Fellowship, Bellagio
 2005 Fellowship of Southern Writers
 2013 Chancellor, Fellowship of Southern Writers

Poetry collections
 Domestic of the Outer Banks, Inland Boat/Porch, 1980
 The Times Between, Johns Hopkins University Press, 1982, 
 
 Balance as Belief, Johns Hopkins University Press, 1989, 
 
 Since the Noon Mail Stopped Johns Hopkins University Press, 1997, 
 
 The Lover's Guide to Trapping, Johns Hopkins University Press, 2009, 
 Couldn’t Prove, Had to Promise, Johns Hopkins University Press, 2014,

Books
 
 Sewanee Writers on Writing, Louisiana State University Press, 2000,

References

1947 births
Living people
American male poets
People from Humboldt, Tennessee
Poets from Tennessee